The 2016 Central African Republic League season is the top level of football competition in Central African Republic.

Teams
A total of 12 teams participate in the Ligue de Bangui Première Division.

References

Football leagues in the Central African Republic
League
Central African Republic